Cavendishia complectens is a shrub found in the neotropics. It commonly grows as an epiphyte.

External links 
Cavendishia complectens species information at New York Botanical Garden

Vaccinioideae
Epiphytes